Neozelia is a genus of parasitic flies in the family Tachinidae. There is one described species in Neozelia, N. alini.

Distribution
Brazil.

References

Dexiinae
Diptera of South America
Tachinidae genera
Monotypic Brachycera genera